William Smith House, also known as Jonas Smith House and Boidock House, is a historic home located at Hamilton, Loudoun County, Virginia.  It was built about 1813–1820, and is a two-story, three bay, Federal style brick dwelling.  It has a recessed right-side dining and kitchen wing, also in brick, originally  stories, now two stories. Also on the property are the contributing brick barn with diamond-patterned ventilation holes (ca 1813), two-story springhouse (c. 1813), a wide loafing shed, a large corncrib, and two-car garage (c. 1948).

It was listed on the National Register of Historic Places in 2003.

References

Houses on the National Register of Historic Places in Virginia
Federal architecture in Virginia
Houses completed in 1820
Houses in Loudoun County, Virginia
National Register of Historic Places in Loudoun County, Virginia
1820 establishments in Virginia